Passiflora capsularis is a member of the family Passifloraceae with vanilla scented, delicate white flowers around  long. It produces unusual looking ribbed ellipsoid fruits reddish purple in color, which are not edible. It grows readily in tropical climates, tolerating down to 5 °C and even lower for short spells. It flowers and grows readily even in small pots.

References

External links

capsularis
Plants described in 1753
Taxa named by Carl Linnaeus